Hype House is an American reality television series, released on Netflix on January 7, 2022. The show follows the lives of each member of the Hype House, a group of content creators who make videos for the social media application TikTok.

Cast
 Chase Hudson
 Nikita Dragun
 Thomas Petrou
 Larray
 Mia Hayward
 Alex Warren
 Jack Wright
 Kouvr Annon
 Vinnie Hacker

Background
The Hype House is a Los Angeles-based group of content creators, who live in the same home and post videos to TikTok and YouTube respectively. The settlement was founded by Thomas Petrou, Daisy Keech, Alex Warren, Chase Hudson. Several TikTok creators with large followings were members of the group, including Charli D'Amelio, Dixie D'Amelio, and Addison Rae.

Episodes

Reception
Reception of the show by the general public has been generally negative.  Many subscribers to Netflix threatened to cancel their subscription due to the release of the show.

Critics are mostly negative. Stephanie McNeal wrote for Buzzfeed News that the show managed to "somehow make being young, rich, and famous in Los Angeles seem horribly depressing." She also wrote that the stars, despite their popularity, were ultimately very boring and unmemorable to watch (with the exception of Larray and Nikita Dragun) and the show itself was "certainly an interesting insight into the machinations of content houses and the struggles that come with them, but it is not a very fun or interesting show."

Allyson Weissman, writing for the student newspaper The Daily Bruin, gave it 2 out of 5 stars, calling the series "uneventful and lifeless".

Madeline Roth of The Daily Beast in a negative review called the show "mind-numbing" and that Larray and Nikita Dragun were "the two saving graces of Hype House".

References

2020s American reality television series
2022 American television series debuts
English-language Netflix original programming
Television series about social media
Television shows set in Los Angeles
TikTok